This article lists political parties in Venezuela.
Historically, Venezuela has had two major parties, along with numerous other minor parties. That system imploded at the 1998 elections into a multi-party system. In the 2005 parliamentary elections, the Fifth Republic Movement emerged as a dominant party. Its position was continued by the United Socialist Party of Venezuela (into which it merged on 20 October 2007), although it is not certain at all if this party system is going to remain stable through the following elections.

List

Alliances

Major parties

Other parties
Parties with no representation in the National Assembly but recent electoral activity:
Esperanza por El Cambio (EL CAMBIO)
National Force (Fuerza Nacional)
Authentic Renewing Organization (Organización Renovadora Autentica)
Democratic Republican Union (Union Republicana Democrática)
Democratic Unity (Unión Democrática)
Ecological Movement of Venezuela (Movimiento Ecológico de Venezuela)
Force of the People (Fuerza de la Gente)
For Social Democracy (Por la Democracia Social)
Free Electors (Electores Libres)
Going Forward (Vamos Adelante)
Independents for the National Community (Independientes por la Comunidad Nacional)
Independent Electoral Political Organization Committee (Comité de Organización Política Electoral Independiente)
Labour Power (Poder Laboral)
Lapy
Liberal Force (Fuerza Liberal)
Movement for a Responsible, Sustainable and Entrepreneurial Venezuela (Movimiento por una Venezuela Responsable, Sostenible y Emprendedora)
Movement for Socialism (Movimiento al Socialismo)
Movement of the Conscience of the Country (Movimiento de Conciencia de País)
National Convergence (Convergencia Nacional)
National Integrity Unity Movement (Movimiento de Integridad Nacional)
National Thought (Pensamiento Nacional)
Networks of Responses of Communitary Changes (Redes de Respuestas de Cambios Comunitarios)
New Revolutionary Way (Nuevo Camino Revolucionario)
New Social Order (Nuevo Orden Social)
Organized Youth of Venezuela (Juventud Organizada de Venezuela)
Patriotic Community Unity (Unidad Patriótica Comunitaria)
People's Electoral Movement (Movimiento Electoral del Pueblo)
Popular Force (Fuerza Popular)
Popular Vanguard (Vanguardia Popular)
Red Flag Party (Partido Bandera Roja)
Renovative Democracy Unity (Unidad Democracia Renovadora)
Revolutionary Middle Class (Clase Media Revolucionaria)
Revolutionary Party of Work (Partido Revolucionario del Trabajo)
Socialism and Liberty Party (Partido Socialismo y Libertad)
Solidarity (Solidaridad)
Solution (Solución)
The Force Of Change (La Fuerza del Cambio)
Revolutionary Movement Tupamaro  (Tendencias Unificadas para Alcanzar el Movimiento de Acción Revolución)
United for Peace and Democracy Democratic Party (Partido Demócrata Unidos por la Paz y la Democracia)
United for Venezuela (Unidos para Venezuela)
United People Liberal Movement (Movimiento Liberal Pueblo Unido)
Venezuela First-class (Venezuela de Primera)
Venezuela Vision Unity (Unidad Visión Venezuela)
Venezuelan Popular Unity (Unidad Popular Venezolana)
Venezuelan Revolutionary Currents (Corrientes Revolucionarias Venezolanas)
Republican Movement (Movimiento Republicano)
We Organized Choose Unity (Unidad Nosotros Organizados Elegimos)

Regional parties
Major regional parties:

Alternative Response Independent Movement (Movimiento Independiente Respuesta Alternativa)
Amazonas's New Route (Nuevo Rumbo de Amazonas)
Autonomous Indigenous Movement of Zulia (Movimiento Indígena Autónomo del Zulia)
Carabobo Proyect (Proyecto Carabobo)
Efficient Revolution (Revolución Eficiente)
FIOOP
Independent Social Alliance of Sucre (Alianza Social Independiente de Sucre)
Independent Regional Emergent Movement (Movimiento Emergente Regional Independiente)
National Council of Venezuelan Indians (Consejo Nacional Indio de Venezuela)
Vargas's First (Vargas de Primera)
Regional Advance Movement - MRA (Movimiento Regional de Avanzada)
Republican Vanguard Force (Fuerza de Vanguardia Republicana)
Revolutionary Social Alliance Party (Partido de Alianza Social Revolucionaria)
United Multiethnic Peoples of the Amazonas (Pueblos Unidos Multiétnicos de Amazonas)
United Movement of Indigenous People (Movimiento Unido de Pueblos Indígenas)
What's Been Achieved by Yaracuy (Lo Alcanzado por Yaracuy)

Defunct parties
Parties with no legal status and parties with no recent electoral activity:

Advanced Answer Independent Electoral Party (Partido Indepeniente Electoral De Repuesta Avanzada)
Araguaney Electoral Movement (Araguaney Movimiento Electoral)
Builders of a Country (Constructores de un Pais)
Civil Resistance (Resistencia Civil)
Community Change Answer (Respuesta de Cambio Comunitario)
Democratic Active National Organization (Organizacion Nacional Democratica Activa)
Democratic Image (Imagen Democratica)
Farming Action (Accion Agropecuaria)
For Love of the City (Por Querer a la Ciudad)
For the Love of Venezuela (Por Querer a Venezuela)
IFP
Independent National Organization (Organización Nacional Independiente)
Independents for Venezuela (Independientes Por Venezuela)
Independents With Vision Of The Future (Independiente Con Vision De Futuro)
Internationalism (Internacionalismo)
Lets Break Chains (Rompamos Cadenas)
National Encounter (Encuentro Nacional)
National Feeling Movement (Movimiento Sentir Nacional)
National Independent Movement (Movimiento Nacional Independiente)
New Order (Nuevo Orden)
National Socialist Liberation Group Pro Venezuela (Grupo Nacional Socialista de Liberacion Pro-Venezuela)
New People Concentration Movement (Movimiento de Concentracion Gente Nueva)
Opening (Apertura)
Party of the Venezuelan Revolution (Partido de la Revolución Venezolana)
Pirate Party of Venezuela (Partido Pirata de Venezuela)
Popular Alliance (Alianza Popular)
Popular Independent Party (Partido Popular Independiente)
Rebirth (Renace)
Sons of the Homeland (Hijos de la Patria)
Venezuela's Flame (La Llama de Venezuela)
VTM
We Are All Venezuela (Venezuela Somos Todos)

Historical parties
Great Liberal Party of Venezuela (Gran Partido Liberal de Venezuela) (1840-1899)
Venezuelan Democratic Party (Partido Democrático Venezolano) (1943-1945)
National Democratic Party (Partido Democrático Nacional)
Progressive Republican Party (Partido Republicano Progresista) (1936)
Venezuelan Revolutionary Party (Partido Revolucionario Venezolano) (1926-1931)
Revolutionary Left Movement (Movimiento de Izquierda Revolucionaria) (1960-1988)
Merged into United Socialist Party of Venezuela:
Fifth Republic Movement (Movimiento V República) (1997-2007)
Venezuelan People's Union (Unión Popular Venezolana)
Socialist League (Liga Socialista) (1973-2007)
Movement for Direct Democracy (Movimiento por la Democracia Directa)
Union Party (Partido Unión)
Militant Civic Movement (Movimiento Civico Militante)
Action Force of Base Coordination (Fuerzas de Acciones de Coordinación de Base)
Merged into Fearless People's Alliance:
Emergent Vision (Vision Emergente)
Merged into Alternative Popular Directory:
Laborist Movement (Movimiento Laborista)
Independent Solidarity (Solidaridad Independiente)
Merged into A New Era:
Only One People (Un Solo Pueblo)
Democratic Left (Izquierda Democratica)
Democratic Pole (Polo Democratico)

See also

Politics of Venezuela
List of political parties by country
Liberalism in Venezuela

External links
2006 Venezuelan presidential elections ballot

 
Political parties
Venezuela
Political parties
Venezuela